Shuko Aoyama and Ena Shibahara defeated Hayley Carter and Luisa Stefani in the final, 6–2, 7–5, to win the women's doubles tennis title at the 2021 Miami Open. Aoyama and Shibahara's first WTA 1000 victory earned them their third title of the year and made them the first Japanese champions in Miami since Ai Sugiyama in 2008.

Elise Mertens and Aryna Sabalenka were the defending champions from when the tournament was last held in 2019, but the pair lost in the first round to Simona Halep and Angelique Kerber.

Sabalenka, Tímea Babos and Hsieh Su-wei were in contention for the WTA doubles No. 1 ranking at the beginning at the tournament. Hsieh usurped Sabalenka for the top ranking after Sabalenka and Babos lost in the first and second round, respectively.

Seeds

Draw

Finals

Top half

Bottom half

References

External links
 Main draw

Miami Open - Women's Doubles
Doubles women